, also released as Tokyo Rampage, is a 1998 Japanese drama film directed by Toshiaki Toyoda. The film was released on October 10, 1998.

Cast
 Akaji Maro - Yakuza boss
 Kiyohiko Shibukawa
 Koji Chihara as Arano
 Onimaru as Kamijo
 Rin Ozawa

Reception
Tom Mes of Midnight Eye wrote that "Pornostar is not a flawless film, but it's one of those debut features that while being noticeably underdeveloped nevertheless shows a great amount of promise in its director."

References

External links

1998 drama films
1998 directorial debut films
1998 films
Films directed by Toshiaki Toyoda
Films set in Tokyo
Films shot in Tokyo
Japanese drama films
Shibuya
Yakuza films
1990s Japanese films